Golden Web may refer to:

The Golden Web (novel), 1910 mystery novel by E. Phillips Oppenheim,
The Golden Web (1920 film), British silent mystery film 
The Golden Web (1926 film), American silent mystery film
Golden Web (company), Ghanaian company